Leopoldshagen is a municipality in the Vorpommern-Greifswald district, in Mecklenburg-Vorpommern, Germany.

Geography
Immediately northwest of Leopoldshagen begins the Anklamer Torfmoor, a protected wetland which runs along the western shore of the Stettin Lagoon to the town of Anklam.

History
The place was founded in 1748. In 1752 King Frederick II of Prussia named the village in honour of his late general Leopold II, Prince of Anhalt-Dessau (1700–1751).

References

Vorpommern-Greifswald